Doaks Crossroads is an unincorporated community in Wilson County, Tennessee, United States. The Spring Creek Presbyterian Church, which is listed on the National Register of Historic Places, is located in Doaks Crossroads. Doaks Crossroads is also home to the "40 acre hackerspace" blog, http://www.chickenroadlabs.com/ and the Wilson County Radio League http://www.wilsonradioleague.wordpress.com/

References

Unincorporated communities in Wilson County, Tennessee
Unincorporated communities in Tennessee